The Boot Street Band was a BBC children comedy television programme which aired for two six-episode seasons in 1993-4. It was set in a school which appears to be run by the students, and was created by Andrew Davies and Steve Attridge. Steve Attridge wrote the second series and a book based on the idea. Idris Elba got his TV break by appearing in the series. Roland MacLeod played Mr Lear and Richard Davies played Mr Cramp.

Episodes

Season 1

Season 2

References

External links

1993 British television series debuts
1994 British television series endings
BBC children's television shows
1990s British children's television series
English-language television shows